SS Mount Washington was one of four Offshore Petroleum Discharge System (OPDS) tankers. Built in 1963 for the commercial trade, the Mount Washington was turned over to the Maritime Administration in 1987 and was placed into the Ready Reserve Force as one thirteen 'Common User Tankers' that can be activated in the event of National Emergency.

Previously layberthed in Houston, the ship was towed to Suisun Bay where she was maintained in a ROS-40 status, meaning she would have been ready for deployment in 40 days or less.

Mount Washington was removed from the Reserve Fleet on 18 November 2013 for scrapping in Brownsville, Texas.

The Ready Reserve Force (RRF) is the Maritime Administration program which provides sealift of supplies for the U.S. military throughout the world. The RRF supplements the Maritime Prepositioning Program which has strategically located ships pre-loaded with Army or Marine Corps equipment.

The former commercial vessels of RRF sit empty while they await call-up. Under the program, the ships must be ready for loading and sailing within 4, 5, 10, or 20 days. Those assigned 4 and 5 day readiness have a permanent skeleton crew of 9 or 10 mariners. Private shipping companies under contract to MARAD provide maintenance, activation, manning, and vessel operation.

The Department of Defense periodically tests readiness of the RRF by initiating no-notice activations, and by routine activations for military cargo operations and exercises. RRF ships are also used for cargo handling training by Navy and Army Reserve units. When activated, control of the RRF ships transfers from the Maritime Administration to the Military Sealift Command, a part of the Navy.

The OPDS was designed by and for the U.S. Navy, for use with the Army and Marine Corps Inland Petroleum Distribution System (IPDS). The OPDS is stored aboard a selected Ready Reserve Fleet tanker. It is transported to a theater of operations by the tanker. The tanker is manned by a civilian crew.

References 

  FM 10-67-1 CONCEPTS AND EQUIPMENT OF PETROLEUM OPERATIONS

External links 
 Photo gallery at navsource.org

1963 ships
Ships built in Quincy, Massachusetts
Unique oilers and tankers of the United States Navy